Camel Spiders is a 2011 made-for-television horror sci-fi film starring Brian Krause, C. Thomas Howell, and Jessica Cameron. It was directed by genre veteran Jim Wynorski and executive-produced by Roger Corman.

Plot
Creatures that for years have been rumoured to torment armed forces in the Middle East are inadvertently introduced to the southwestern deserts of the United States. The camel spiders now freely hunt for prey, unafraid of any predator—including man. No place is safe; no one is beyond their paralyzing bite. In the end, a number of hardy fighters band together to make one last stand against the creatures.

Cast
 Brian Krause as Captain Mike Sturges
 C. Thomas Howell as Sheriff Ken Beaumont
 Melissa Brasselle as Sergeant Shelly Underwood
 Frankie Cullen as Schwalb
 Jessica Cameron as Ashley
 Hayley Sanchez as Hayley Mullins

Release

Home media
Camel Spiders was released on DVD and Blu-ray by Lionsgate on May 27, 2012.

Reception

Brett Gallman from horror film review website Oh, the Horror! gave the film a mostly negative review. In his review, Gallman criticized the film's direction, and screenplay; stating that the film "starts with the potential to be among the best of these new-wave Corman creature features, but ends up just being in the middle of the pack".
Jason Coffman from Film Monthly.com gave the film a positive review, writing, "It’s not a game-changing masterpiece or anything, but Camel Spiders is proof that Corman’s approach to low-budget filmmaking is still capable of turning out fun stuff."

Trivia
The film was broadcast on Tele 5 as part of the programme format SchleFaZ in season 2.

References

External links
 
 
 

2011 television films
2011 films
2011 horror films
2010s science fiction horror films
Films about spiders
Films directed by Jim Wynorski
Films shot in Indiana
Syfy original films
2010s monster movies
American monster movies
American natural horror films
American horror television films
2010s American films